Josep Rodríguez Ruiz (born 28 November 1993) is a Spanish motorcycle racer. He has competed in the CEV Moto3 championship and the CEV 125GP championship.

Career statistics

Grand Prix motorcycle racing

By season

Races by year
(key)

References

External links

Living people
1993 births
Sportspeople from Manresa
Spanish motorcycle racers
Motorcycle racers from Catalonia
125cc World Championship riders
Moto3 World Championship riders